Xylophaga nandani is a species of bivalve in the family Xylophagaidae named after professor Sivasankaran Bijoy Nandan, an eminent marine biologist in India.

References

Myida
Molluscs described in 2022